Abutia-Kpota is a farming community located at South-Western part of Ho, the capital town of Volta Region, Ghana. Abutia Kpota is one of the towns within the Ho West Parliamentary Constituency. The town is near the Kalapa Re-source Reserve.

History

People
Abutia Kpota is one of the numerous settler towns in the Abutia Traditional Area. The people of Abutia belong to the Eʋedome group of the Eʋes. Abutia has 3 ain traditional towns which are Abutia Kloe, Abutia Agove and Abutia Teti. The Paramount Chief of Abutia is from Abutia Teti with divisional Chiefs from Abutia Kloe and Abutia Agove.  All Chiefs in the Abutia Paramountcy pays allegiance to the Paramount Chief called Togbega Abutia Kodzo Gidi IV.
The majority of them are Christians, whilst  a few are traditionalist. in the past, there were some Muslims too, but for now, they have dissolved into the ewe tribe.

Education
There is Evangelical Presbyterian School comprising Kindergarten, Primary and J.H.S.  The Basic Education Certificate Examination (BECE)  is annually staged at a nearby town, Abutia-Kloe. Performance of the outgoing students have not been encouraging over the years until recently one graduating class recorded 100% overall pass mark (i.e.  The cohort qualify for admission into S.H.S.) in the BECE.

Agriculture
The community produces cassava, maize, rice and vegetables such as okra. The Abutia Kpota farms which is an initiative of the National Service Scheme mainly deals in  maize plantation.

References 

Populated places in the Volta Region